Nils Torbjörn Thoresson (born December 29, 1959) is a Swedish sprint canoer who competed from the early to mid-1980s. He won a silver medal in the K-4 10000 m event at the 1985 ICF Canoe Sprint World Championships in Mechelen.

Thoresson also finished ninth in the K-4 1000 m event at the 1980 Summer Olympics in Moscow.

Thoresson went on spending his professional career as a Fire Fighter and retired 2019. Not to settle down in retirement but to continue working as a PE-teacher. He lives a quiet family life and still enjoys canoeing.

References

Sports-reference.com profile

1959 births
Canoeists at the 1980 Summer Olympics
Living people
Olympic canoeists of Sweden
Swedish male canoeists
ICF Canoe Sprint World Championships medalists in kayak